Kelsey Tessier (born January 16, 1990) is a Canadian professional ice hockey player who currently plays with Dragons de Rouen of the Ligue Magnus.

Playing career
Tessier was selected by the Colorado Avalanche in the 4th round (110th overall) of the 2008 NHL Entry Draft. Prior to turning professional, Tessier played major junior hockey in the Quebec Major Junior Hockey League primarily with the Quebec Remparts before he was traded in his final year to the Moncton Wildcats.

Despite not being tendered with a contract by the Avalanche, Tessier turned professional and was invited to the New York Rangers training camp on September 8, 2010. While impressing during the pre-season Tessier was sent to AHL affiliate, the Hartford Wolf Pack and was later signed to a one-year AHL contract.

In his first professional season in 2010–11, Tessier finished second among rookies in posting 10 goals and 28 points. On July 6, 2011, Tessier was re-signed by the Connecticut Whale for a second season. Tessier repeated his rookie performance with the Whale in 2011–12, scoring 30 points in 75 games. In the 2012 Calder cup playoffs, Tessier finished with 5 points, to place third among the team.

On September 17, 2012, Tessier was re-signed to his third consecutive one-year contract with the Whale. Despite a slow start to the 2012–13 season, Tessier still produced 11 goals and 13 assists from primarily a depth role in 71 games.

As the longest tenured Whale player, Tessier initially agreed to return to the renamed Wolf Pack for a fourth successive season. On July 15, 2013, Tessier was granted a release from his contract and signed a one-year deal with Swedish club, Rögle BK of the HockeyAllsvenskan. Tessier was attracted by Sporting director Anders Carlsson, who drafted him whilst apart of the Colorado Avalanche scouting department in 2008.

In the 2013–14 season, Tessier quickly established himself amongst Rögle's top offensive players. In 52 games, Tessier scored 42 points to lead the club and finish 6th in overall HockeyAllsvenskan points. With ambition to play at a higher level, Tessier left Rögle and signed a one-year contract with newly promoted Finnish Liiga club, Vaasan Sport, on April 30, 2014. Tessier played five scoreless games with Sport, before opting to return to the Allsvenskan with Karlskrona HK for the remainder of the season.

On July 14, 2015, Tessier signed a one-year contract in a return to newly promoted Rögle BK of the SHL. In the 2015–16 season, Tessier was reduced to a limited role in 10 games with Rögle before he mutually agreed to leave the club and sign with IF Björklöven of the Allsvenskan for the remainder of the season on December 30, 2015.

As a free agent in the off-season, Tessier moved to Austria, agreeing to an optional two-year deal with the Vienna Capitals of the EBEL on July 13, 2016.

Career statistics

References

External links

1990 births
IF Björklöven players
Canadian ice hockey centres
Colorado Avalanche draft picks
Connecticut Whale (AHL) players
Dragons de Rouen players
Hartford Wolf Pack players
Ice hockey people from New Brunswick
Karlskrona HK players
Living people
Moncton Wildcats players
Quebec Remparts players
Rögle BK players
Sportspeople from Fredericton
Vaasan Sport players
Vienna Capitals players
VIK Västerås HK players
Canadian expatriate ice hockey players in Austria
Canadian expatriate ice hockey players in Finland
Canadian expatriate ice hockey players in Sweden